Up the Women is a BBC television sitcom created, written by and starring Jessica Hynes. It was first broadcast on BBC Four on 30 May 2013. The sitcom is about a group of women in 1910 who form a Women's Suffrage movement. Hynes originally planned to write a comedy film about a suffragette plot to assassinate H. H. Asquith, but after realising the plot had turned quite dark, she decided to write a sitcom instead. Christine Gernon directed the three-part series, which became the last sitcom to be filmed before a live audience at BBC Television Centre and the first to be commissioned for BBC Four. A second series was commissioned in June 2013 and aired on BBC Two from 21 January 2015. Up the Women was not renewed for a third series.

Premise
The sitcom is set in 1910 and focuses on the women of the Banbury Intricate Craft Circle and their level of commitment to the women's suffrage movement. Having seen the Women's suffrage movement in London, Margaret (Jessica Hynes) returns to Banbury and asks the ladies of her local craft circle to support the cause. The group start up their own suffrage league called Banbury Intricate Craft Circle Politely Requests Women's Suffrage (BICCPRWS), but the league faces opposition from Helen (Rebecca Front).

Production

Conception

In February 2013, the BBC announced that Richard Klein and Shane Allen had commissioned the three-part comedy Up the Women, which was created and written by Jessica Hynes. Up the Women was the first sitcom filmed in front of a live audience to be commissioned for BBC Four. Andrew Williams from the Metro revealed that should the pilot series of Up the Women do well, then there would be a possible re-commission, which would see where the character's stories go.

Hynes came up with the idea for Up the Women in 2009 after she read a piece about a suffragette plot to assassinate former Prime Minister H. H. Asquith. Hynes thought it would make a good comedy film and sold that idea to the BBC. However, when she came to research it, she realised that the plot was quite dark and felt that she had written "a probably quite dull, tediously worthy drama", which the BBC passed on.

Hynes found that she could not let go of the characters she had created and thought the BBC might want a comedy instead. In 2011, Hynes wrote a new treatment, which focused on her characters and their craft circle in a Banbury church hall. She said "I thought, it would work if you went really retro with it, to make it much easier to relate to these women, who are warm, who are failing. Comedy only really works if you are failing. I made it deliberately restrictive, a church hall and a kitchen, nowhere to go to, nowhere to run and nowhere to hide. I just loved that."

On 31 May 2013, Hynes revealed that Up the Women had been picked up for a full series of six episodes. This was confirmed by the BBC on 12 June. Series two was broadcast on BBC Two and controller of the channel, Janice Hadlow, stated "I'm delighted to welcome the Banbury Intricate Craft Circle to BBC Two. With brilliant writing from Jessica Hynes and a fabulous cast including Rebecca Front, Judy Parfitt and Adrian Scarborough, Up The Women is a wonderful addition to comedy on the channel." The series began airing from 21 January 2015.

On 31 March 2015, the BBC confirmed that they would not be renewing Up the Woman for a third series. A spokesperson for BBC2 commented, "After two great series, sadly there won't be any more Up The Women on BBC2 as the channel looks to bring new comedy shows through."

Filming
Christine Gernon directed the series, which was set in two locations; a church hall and the kitchen. Hynes wanted the show to have "a deliberately retro-sitcom feel" and explained that writing and filming a show set in a studio was unlike anything she had previously done. The first series was recorded on 3, 10 and 17 March 2013 in Studio 3 (TC3) at BBC Television Centre. Up the Women was the last sitcom to be filmed before a live audience at BBC Television Centre. The Village Hall in Cholesbury, Buckinghamshire was used for the external view of the Hall shown at the start of each episode, and the dimensions and layout of the main room of the Village Hall are reflected in the show set.

Cast and characters
Hynes plays "bright-but-stifled matron" Margaret. The actress told Vicki Power from the Daily Express that her character was inspired by Christabel Pankhurst. Comedian Rebecca Front portrays the group's president and antagonist Helen. Judy Parfitt stars as Helen's mother, Myrtle. Vicki Pepperdine is Gwen, a spinster, while Emma Pierson is Eva, a mother of fourteen. Adrian Scarborough appears as the church hall caretaker Mr Miller. Georgia Groome and Ryan Sampson also appear as Emily and Thomas. Sandi Toksvig appeared in the third episode as Emmeline Pankhurst.

Theme music
During the titles the song "Nana Was a Suffragette" is played. It was written and performed by Jules Gibb.

Episodes

Series 1 (2013)

Series 2 (2015)

Reception
Jane Simon from the Daily Mirror commented "This is gentle, ever-so-slightly earnest comedy. The fact that it's played more or less dead straight, rather than being a knockabout gag-fest, means it might struggle to find an audience. But it's all the more impressive for its approach." The South Wales Evening Post's Kathy Griffiths chose the first episode of Up the Women as her TV highlight of the week. She quipped that the episode contains some good lines and hinted at becoming better in future episodes. Referring to the placement of Up the Women in the schedules Griffths said "And far better a smaller debut and potential to grow a following on BBC4 than a big trumpeted arrival on mainstream station only to be greeted by dismay and criticism, that poor Vicious has faced." Rachel Aroesti from The Guardian called the third episode "the best" of the first series.

Up the Women was shortlisted for the Best TV Situation Comedy accolade at the 2014 Writers' Guild of Great Britain Awards.

Home media
Series 1 and 2 were released together on DVD on 2 March 2015.

References

External links
 
 
 

Fiction set in 1910
2010s British sitcoms
2013 British television series debuts
BBC television sitcoms
English-language television shows
Television series set in the 1910s
Women's suffrage in the United Kingdom
2015 British television series endings
Cultural depictions of Emmeline Pankhurst
Cultural depictions of Winston Churchill